Trenton is a city in Gilchrist County, Florida, United States. The population was 1,999 as of the 2010 census, and in 2018 it was estimated to be 2,125. It is the county seat of Gilchrist County.

Geography

Trenton is located near the southern border of Gilchrist County at  (29.615081, –82.817732). U.S. Route 129 is the city's Main Street; it leads north  to Branford and south  to Chiefland. Florida State Road 47 (Trenton Boulevard) intersects US 129 in the northern part of Trenton and leads northeast  to Lake City.

Trenton is in a rural area and is the hometown of country music singer Easton Corbin.

History

Prehistory
The first Paleo-Indians reached the central Florida area near the end of the last ice age, as they followed big game south. As the ice melted and sea levels rose, these Native Americans ended up staying and thrived on the peninsula for thousands of years. By the time the first Spanish conquistadors arrived, there were over 250,000 Native Americans living on the peninsula. The Timucua were a historic tribe across the north central area of Florida, where Trenton later developed.

Within 150 years, the majority of the pre-Columbian Native American peoples of Florida died of new infectious diseases or warfare, with their societies disrupted. Some were enslaved by the Spaniards, and died because of harsh treatment. Little is left of these first Native American cultures in Trenton except for scant archeological records, including a few personal artifacts. By the early 19th century, the remnants of these tribes merged with the Bell Indians, Muscogee (also known as Creek) who migrated from Georgia and Alabama. They created a new culture through ethnogenesis and became known as the Seminole people. Most of the Seminole were removed from central Florida by the United States after wars from the 1830s to 1842, while some resisted by moving south into the Everglades and survived.

Post-Reconstruction to present
Western Alachua County was developed largely for farms and timber, which sometimes attracted itinerant workers. Trenton developed as a trading and market town for this area, with some professionals who worked here in the early 20th century.

On July 21, 1915, Dr. H.M. Owens was lynched by a mob in Trenton after being told to leave town. He was at the house of Mrs. McGuire, which the mob set on fire after the doctor exchanged fire with the crowd. The doctor was shot to death as he fled the burning house.  Dr. Owens's local Masonic Lodge was disbanded in the ensuing scandal and only reopened in the 1950s.

At the time, the city of Trenton was still located in Alachua County, which had the sixth highest number of lynchings of counties in Florida.

2018 Shooting

On Thursday, April 19, 2018, two Gilchrist County Sheriff's deputies were attacked and slain by a lone gunman while on duty, eating lunch at a local restaurant.  The two deputies were identified by Sheriff Bobby Schultz as Sgt. Noel Ramirez and Deputy Taylor Lindsey.  The killer, identified as Gilchrist County resident John Hubert Highnote, was found outside the restaurant in his vehicle, where he had committed suicide.  The investigation into any possible motive was inconclusive.

Demographics

The 2000 U.S. Census indicates that Trenton has 608 households, and 390 families residing in the city. The racial makeup of the city was 77.67% White, 20.16% African American, 0.12% Native American, 0.25% Asian, 0.06% Pacific Islander, 0.43% from other races, and 1.30% from two or more races. Hispanic or Latino of any race were 1.67% of the population.

There were 608 households, out of which 33.6% had children under the age of 18 living with them, 42.4% were married couples living together, 19.4% had a female widow with no husband present, and 35.7% were non-white. 30.4% of all households were made up of individuals, and 14.6% had someone living alone who was 65 years of age or older.  The average household size was 2.47 and the average family size was 3.10.

In the city, the population was spread out, with 27.6% under the age of 18, 8.4% from 18 to 24, 23.6% from 25 to 44, 18.8% from 45 to 64, and 21.6% who were 65 years of age or older.  The median age was 37 years. For every 100 females, there were 83.1 males.  For every 100 females age 18 and over, there were 75.7 males.

The median income for a household in the city was $25,259, and the median income for a family was $29,773. Males had a median income of $24,000 versus $21,302 for females. The per capita income for the city was $13,054.  About 18.9% of families and 20.4% of the population were below the poverty line, including 30.2% of those under age 18 and 15.2% of those age 65 or over.

Education

Trenton Elementary School serves Trenton area students in grades PreK–5.  The Principal is Ronda Adkins and the Assistant Principal is Scott Allen.  Students in grades 6–12 attend Trenton Middle High School.  The Principal is Cheri Langford and the Assistant Principals are Scott Hall and Devin Colley.

Schools 
Trenton, Florida is home to two schools - Trenton Elementary School and Trenton Middle High School.

Historic buildings
Historic buildings in Trenton include:

 Gilchrist County Courthouse
 Trenton Depot
 The Trenton Church of Christ on South Main Street

Notable people

 Easton Corbin, country music singer

References

External links
 
 City of Trenton official website
 Trenton/Gilchrist County Chamber of Commerce 

Cities in Gilchrist County, Florida
County seats in Florida
Gainesville metropolitan area, Florida
Cities in Florida